Rachel "Raquel" Turner (formerly Slater; born 4 June 1957) is a fictional character from the BBC television sit-com Only Fools and Horses, in which she is Del Boy's long-term partner. She is portrayed by Tessa Peake-Jones.

Character creation
With Only Fools and Horses moving into its sixth series, writer John Sullivan wanted Del Boy to start looking for more mature women, rather than continually chasing 20-year-olds, and to have a long-term relationship, so he came up with the character Raquel for the 1988 Christmas special episode, "Dates".

Biography
During the episode, she was introduced to Del via a dating agency and at first the two got on well. She told Del that she was a trained actress, with ambitions to have a full-time career in the profession, although her only experiences of the business had been an unsuccessful pop duo with a friend, Double Cream. She made various low-key stage appearances, (including one headlining at the Talk of the Town, Reading, in which she fluffed her lines so badly that the crowd cheered when last orders was announced) and a one-line part in a Doctor Who episode. She also mentioned that, owing to her career choice, she had long been estranged from her parents, not having seen or spoken to them for years.

However, she supplemented her income with a part-time job as a stripagram, a fact Del only discovered when he unwittingly booked her for Uncle Albert's birthday party at the Nag's Head pub. Humiliated in front of all his friends, Del told her he no longer wanted to see her. However, she then told Del that if he wanted her to stay, she would refuse the job she had been offered in the Middle East and remain with him. Del changed his mind but an untimely misunderstanding with the police (when he mistook a female officer for another stripper) resulted in him being arrested and unable to meet her. Heartbroken, she left London to work in the Middle East and later the United States.

It was initially intended for that to be Raquel's only appearance in the show, but a year later Sullivan wrote her into the series again, for the 1989 Christmas special, "The Jolly Boys' Outing". During the episode, Del and a group of friends were on their annual day trip to Margate and, by chance, were stranded there for the night when their coach blew up. They went to a night club that evening, where Raquel was working as a magician's stage assistant. She and Del spoke again, and this time agreed to stay in touch. Shortly afterwards, Raquel moved back to Peckham with Del and, from series seven onwards, she became a permanent character.

Thereafter, Raquel tried on several occasions to resurrect her show-business career, such as auditioning for Shakespeare plays (she won a role in a production, only to turn it down after discovering that she was pregnant) and appearing on stage alongside the singing dustman with a speech impediment, Tony Angelino, in "Stage Fright". Following the birth of her and Del's son, Damien, she became a housewife, taking over the cooking and cleaning roles from Uncle Albert. In a plot twist in "The Class of '62", it was revealed that she had previously been married to Roy Slater, corrupt police officer and nemesis of Del, for four years. Raquel was reunited with her parents in "Time On Our Hands", when she invited them to dinner at the flat.

A kind-hearted and motherly figure, in Del she met a man with a similar nature – well-intentioned but ultimately with ambitions beyond his talent. Their relationship suffered several problems, and she briefly left Del in "Fatal Extraction" due to his gambling and heavy drinking. They were ultimately reconciled, though never married, despite hints of Del's desire to marry her. Her character also changed as the show went on, moving from an ambitious woman lacking in confidence, to a tougher sarcastic one unafraid to stand up to Del's scheming and fast-talking nature.

Family tree

Notes

Further reading
 
 

Only Fools and Horses characters
Fictional actors
Fictional singers
Fictional English people
Television characters introduced in 1988
Female characters in television